Oldfield is a surname, and occasionally a given name.

Given name
Oldfield Thomas, British zoologist

Surname

Anne Oldfield, 18th century English actress
Audrey Oldfield, Australian children's writer and historian
Augustus Frederick Oldfield, 18th century botanist
Barney Oldfield, early American automobile racer
Bert Oldfield, Australian cricket player
Brian Oldfield, American track and field athlete
Bruce Oldfield, British fashion designer
Buddy Oldfield, British cricket player and umpire
Christopher Oldfield, English cricketer and British Army officer
Clarence Oldfield, South African runner and Olympic medalist
Claude Houghton Oldfield, British novelist who published as Claude Houghton
David Oldfield (politician), Australian politician
David Oldfield (footballer), English football player and manager
Edmund L. Oldfield (1863–1938), American politician
Eric Oldfield, Australian actor
George Oldfield (police officer), a British police detective involved in a number of high-profile cases
George S. Oldfield, a prominent academic in the field of finance
Jim Oldfield, American magazine writer on computers
 John Oldfield (footballer) (1943–2002), English footballer
 John Oldfield (engineer) (1937–2002),  British engineer and Ford executive
 John William Oldfield (1886–1955), figure in the commercial and public life in Ceylon
Maurice Oldfield, director of MI6 in the 1970s
Mike Oldfield, British rock instrumentalist best known for his work Tubular Bells
Ora A. Oldfield (1893–1963), American businessman and politician
Paul Oldfield (active 1991-), flatulent performer, known as Mr. Methane
Pearl Peden Oldfield (1876-1962), American politician
Sally Oldfield, British singer and sister of Mike Oldfield
Terry Oldfield, British composer and brother of Mike Oldfield
Terry Oldfield (footballer), English footballer who played for Bristol Rovers and Wrexham
Wendy Oldfield, South African singer
William Oldfield (British politician) (1881-1961)
William Allan Oldfield (1874-1928), American congressman from Arkansas

References